The XXIV International Society for Contemporary Music Festival was held on June 23–30, 1950 in Brussels. All concerts took place at the Institut National de Radiodiffusion's large studio hall. 

This edition was notable for the posthumous premiere of Anton Webern's last work, his Cantata No. 2. Other works performed included: 

  Conrad Beck
 Sonatina for Piano No. 2
  Niels Viggo Bentzon
 Chamber Concerto, Op. 52
  Eunice Catunda
 Hommage to Schönberg
  Klaus Egge
 Sinfonia Giocosa, Op. 22
  Hanns Eisler
 Sinfonietta, Op. 29
  Marius Flothuis
 Concerto for Piano and Chamber Orchestra
  Wolfgang Fortner
 Cello Sonata
  Peter Racine Fricker
 String Quartet No. 1, Op. 8
  Karl Amadeus Hartmann
 Symphony No. 4
  Hans Henkemans
 Flute Concerto
  Karel Husa
 String Quartet No. 1, Op. 8
  André Jolivet
 Psyché
  René Leibowitz
 L'Explication des Metaphores, Op. 15
  Artur Malawski
 Toccata and Fugue in Variation Form for Piano and Orchestra
  Darius Milhaud
 Les Rêves de Jacob, Dance Suite, Op. 294
  Shukichi Mitsukuri
 Ten Haikai of Bashō
  Roman Palester
 Cantata of the Vistula
  Fernand Quinet
 Three Symphonic Movements
  Alan Rawsthorne
 Concerto for String Orchestra
  Harald Saeverud
 Symphony No. 5 'Quasi una Fantasia', Op. 16
  Giacinto Scelsi
 La Nascita del Verbo, Cantata

References
 Music Survey, Summer 1950 (pages 44-46). Review by Humphrey Searle.

Music festivals in Belgium 
ISMC 1950